Blackened Sky is the debut studio album by Scottish rock band Biffy Clyro. Largely produced with the band by Chris Sheldon, it was released by Beggars Banquet Records on 10 March 2002. The album reached number 78 on the UK Albums Chart, and spawned four singles. A deluxe remastered edition was released in 2012, which featured, in addition to the original 12 album tracks, two songs from the band's debut extended play (EP) thekidswhopoptodaywillrocktomorrow and a number of B-sides from the album's singles.

Reception

Critical reception to Biffy Clyro's debut album was generally mixed. John Murphy of independent music website musicOMH, writing at the time of its release in 2002, claimed that Blackened Sky was evidence of Biffy's status as "the most exciting new band in Britain", drawing comparisons to influencing band Nirvana and praising elements such as the consistency in the vocal performances. His review was not entirely positive though, as he pointed out that "with this album ... the band sometimes lose the balance between light and shade", claiming that "There's no sign of any kind of breakthrough song here, ... but if you take the time to explore this Blackened Sky you'll find a few shining stars worth exploring". Jason MacNeil of PopMatters was similarly indecisive, concluding that Blackened Sky was "Generally a credible first step despite some lapses in judgement".

Allmusic critic Dean Carlson was less generous, awarding the album a low rating of 1.5 out of five stars; the review proposed that on the album "the band came across as all of the least interesting aspects of American grunge released a decade too late", with the website claiming that Biffy did not live up to the hype they had received prior to the album's release.

Track listing

Personnel

Biffy Clyro
Simon Neil – vocals, guitars, production
James Johnston – bass, vocals, production
Ben Johnston – drums, vocals, production
Additional musicians
Lyndsey Joss – additional instrument (track 15)
Martin Scott – drums (track 15)
Additional personnel
Chris Blair – mastering
Phil Lee – design
Tom Collier – cover photography
Paul McCallum – band photography

Production personnel
Chris Sheldon – production, recording and engineering (tracks 1, 3, 4, 6 and 9–12), mixing
Paul Corkett – production, recording and engineering (tracks 5, 7 and 8)
DP Johnson – production, recording and engineering (tracks 2 and 15–20)
S.A.G. – production, recording and engineering (tracks 2 and 15–20)
Mike Walker – production, recording and engineering (track 13)
Jamie Hart – production assistance (track 13)
Dan Swift – engineering (track 21)
Dan Austin – engineering assistance
Graham Dominy – engineering assistance
Kevin Gallagher – engineering assistance
Sam Miller – engineering assistance

Certifications

Release history

References

2002 debut albums
Biffy Clyro albums
Albums produced by Chris Sheldon
Beggars Banquet Records albums